Overasselt is a village in the Dutch province of Gelderland. It is located in the municipality of Heumen.

History 
The village was first mentioned in the 13th century as Asle, and means "upper open forest with ash (Fraxinus excelsior) trees". Over (upper) has been added to distinguish between Nederasselt. Overasselt developed in the Early Middle Ages on a ridge. The village used to be concentrated around the former Dutch Reformed church.

The former Dutch Reformed church was built in 1710 using material from its 15th century predecessor. The Catholic St. Antonius Abt Church was built 1891. Near the village are the ruins of St. Walrick, a 15th century Benedictine priory which used to belong to the Abbey of Saint-Valery-sur-Somme, France.

Overasselt was home to 146 people in 1840. Overasselt was a separate municipality until 1 July 1980, when it was merged with Heumen.

Trivia
The famous Josephine Baker had a performance at 4 and 5 December 1944 in Cafe Van Lin. Proof of this suggested show was found in 2019 in the form off a play list together with a hotel voucher and a little copybook.

Gallery

References

Populated places in Gelderland
Former municipalities of Gelderland
Heumen